The Telecommunications Authority of Trinidad and Tobago is the organisation that regulates telecommunications and broadcasting services in Trinidad and Tobago.  Its chairman is Mr. Gilbert Peterson.

The Telecommunications Authority of Trinidad and Tobago was formed in July 2004, upon full proclamation of the Trinidad and Tobago Telecommunications Act 2001, as amended by the Trinidad and Tobago Telecommunications (Amendment) Act 2004.

References

External links
 

Government agencies of Trinidad and Tobago
Communications in Trinidad and Tobago
Telecommunications regulatory authorities
Regulation in Trinidad and Tobago